A necrology is an obituary.

Necrology may also refer to:

 Necrology (EP), a 1991 EP by General Surgery
 A registry of deaths within Civil registration
 Necrology, a short film by Standish Lawder